Ten Cate is a Dutch toponymic surname originally meaning "at the house".  It may refer to:

Cees ten Cate (1890-1972), Dutch football striker
Henk ten Cate (born 1954), Dutch football winger and coach
Siebe Johannes ten Cate (1858–1908), Dutch impressionist painter

See also
 Ten Kate, Dutch surname with the same origin
 Bank Ten Cate & Cie, a Dutch bank
 Theo ten Caat (born 1964), Dutch football forward

References

Dutch-language surnames
Toponymic surnames